Ruth Adolf (born 3 July 1943) is a Swiss alpine skier. She competed in two events at the 1964 Winter Olympics.

References

1943 births
Living people
Swiss female alpine skiers
Olympic alpine skiers of Switzerland
Alpine skiers at the 1964 Winter Olympics
Sportspeople from Bern
20th-century Swiss women